Trunk Cay is a small grass-covered islet in Trunk Bay in the United States Virgin Islands. It has an elevation of 48 feet and is situated only 200 feet from Trunk Bay Beach. It is an islet of rocky cliffs, coral sandy beaches, and palm trees. The Virgin Islands National Park Service offers underwater snorkelling trails around the cay. Trunk Cay is named for the leatherback turtle, which is found in the U.S.V.I. and is locally known as trunks.

References 

Uninhabited islands of the United States Virgin Islands